Orient is a coastal locality in the Shire of Hinchinbrook, Queensland, Australia.

Geography
The Coral Sea forms the eastern boundary.

References 

Shire of Hinchinbrook
Coastline of Queensland
Localities in Queensland